Song In was a civil official in the mid-Goryeo era who became the intermediary founder of the Jincheon Song clan. His highest post was munha pyeongjangsa (문하 평장사). This was the highest government position in the period. Song It was responsible for administration, judicial affairs and economy in the district.

As he performed meritorious deeds during the King, he was conferred with Chanhwagongsin and Jincheonbaek. Baek was a position of politicians who were responsible for administration, judicial affairs and economy in the district. As the government created him Jincheonbaek, his family started regarding Jincheon as their origin. Hence, the family origin became Jincheon Song.

When he was in the position of Sangsanbaek, he tried to be just and fair in all the administrative affairs and strived to enhance the welfare of his people. He also focused on education for the youth and courtesy for people, which made his district famous for most excellent behaviors in the nation. After that, the people have long paid tribute to his feats.

During the insurrection of Yi Jagyeom in the 4th year of King Injong of Goryeo's reign in 1126, he was killed by a rebellious band led by Cheok Jun-gyeong while escorting the king. After the rebels were put down, Song It was posthumously named 'meritous subject' and titled Lord Sangsanbaek (상산백).

Song was born in Durujinmaeul (village), Duchon-ri, Deoksan-myeon in 1125 during the reign of King Injong of the Goryeo Dynasty. He was promoted to Pyeonjangsa, which was the highest government position in the period.

Tomb of Song In

Chungcheongbuk-do Monument No. 91
Location: Duchon-ri, Deoksan-myeon, Jincheon-gun

This is the tomb of Song In (?-1126). It has a rectangular-shaped protective wall surrounding the tomb, typical of the Goryeo style. There are two tombstones erected in the late Joseon Dynasty period.

In the grave area, there are many tombs that belong to the clan. In front of his tomb stands the jaesil (chamber for memorial rites) with the tablet reading 'Sangsanjae'.

His grave is in Duchon-ri, Deoksan-myeon, which had been called Duruji, Sanjeong-myeon. The beautiful peak behind his grave is called Mountain Bibong which was named after Bongsae (bird) that is said to live in heaven and to fly down to sit on the summit. However, after the statue was inscribed of In Gong, the founder of Jincheon Song, the peak was compared to a slowly dropped ume flower. Thus, Mountain Bibong was called Maesanbibong, in which 'Mae' was named after an ume flower instead of a bird.

As he was a meritorious subject and served as a Pyeongjangsa (higher government official), the government ordered his grave mound to be surrounded by stones and a monument. The grave is one of the oldest ones in Jincheon and is recorded in Seokchong (stone tomb) in Hwanyeoseungram.

Thousands of descendants of Jincheon Song are living across the nation. Song Guk-cheom and Song Eon-gi who were devoted to fight against the Mongolian invasion into Goryeo are also the offspring of Jincheonbaek.

See also
Song (Korean name)
Bon-gwan

References

External links

 Song In
 Monument 91, Tomb of Song In
 Jincheon Song bon-gwan information (Korean)
 Jincheon Song bon-gwan website (Korean)
 https://archive.today/20061008023513/http://www.jincheon.go.kr/english/sub04/sub0404_01.jsp

Korean politicians
Song clan of Jincheon